Bonsai Barber is a barber-simulation video game developed by Zoonami and released for the Wii console in 2009 in North America, Japan, and the PAL Regions. This video game was a featured WiiWare title for 1,000 Wii Points on the Wii Shop Channel.

Gameplay
Bonsai Barber places players in the role of a barber who must groom and style the foliage of their plant, fruit and vegetable customers in similar manner to the art of bonsai pruning. Using the Wii Remote, the player uses tools such as scissors for cutting, hair clippers for precision cutting, combs to bend twigs, hairspray to re-grow foliage, and pots of paint to change hair color. Players work on the requests of up to five customers per day and try to achieve a professional five star rated cut for each, unlocking new haircuts each day. Players will unlock medals and gifts for performing well, with the insensitive to return the next day to continue obtaining those rewards. If you miss appointments with the in-game patrons, you will get notified in your Wii Message Board; an additional incentive to return to the game the next day and continue cutting hair. Players will be able to send photos of their completed stylings to friends via WiiConnect24.

Development and release
Bonsai Barber was developed by Zoonami. Three prototypes of the game were developed on and off by a team of two people before the game moved into full development. In total, development for Bonsai Barber stretched over a period of two and a quarter years. The game was released in North America on the WiiWare service on March 30, 2009.

Reception

Bonsai Barber received generally positive reviews from critics. IGN commended the tight, responsive controls and the quirky nature of the game, but also called it a pricey one trick pony. Official Nintendo Magazine loved the concept and the humor and called it "an enjoyable, idiosyncratic experience".

References

2009 video games
Action video games
Business simulation games
Nintendo games
Video games developed in the United Kingdom
Wii-only games
WiiWare games
Wii games
Multiplayer and single-player video games
Video games about plants